HMAS LST 3022 was a Mark 3 Landing Ship Tank (LST) operated by the Royal Navy (as HMS LST 3022) during World War II, and the Royal Australian Navy (RAN) from 1946 until 1954.

The vessel was built by Lithgows at their shipyard in Port Glasgow, Scotland, and was launched on 26 January 1945. Propulsion was provided by triple expansion engines, which delivered  to the two propellers. The LCTs had a ship's company of 104, and could carry a maximum load of 168 troops, eighteen 40-ton tanks, 27 trucks, and seven Landing Craft Mechanized. In RAN service, LST 3022 was armed with four 40 mm Bofors in two twin mounts and six 20 mm Oerlikons in two twin and two single mounts.

LST 3022 operated with the Royal Navy during World War II. In 1946, LST 3022 and five other Mark 3 LSTs were loaned to the RAN. They were all commissioned into RAN service on 1 July 1946. LST 3022 was placed in reserve before the end of the year, and was not recommissioned.

LST 3022 was sold to R.R. Coote for disposal on 4 June 1950. The vessel was purchased by the Queensland Cement and Lime Company. in September 1954, was converted into a dredge, and renamed Coral. In this role she was operated alongside the former Australian Army vessel Crusader, which had also been purchased by the Queensland Cement and Lime Company, converted to a coral barge and renamed Cementco.

Citations

References

LST 3022
1945 ships
LST (3)-class tank landing ships of the Royal Australian Navy